Bogas may refer to:

People
Ed Bogas
John Bogas, tenth-century Byzantine general

Places
Villanueva de Bogas, Toledo municipality
Bauka, California, also known as Bogas